Cymatic Scan is a collaborative album by Bill Laswell and Tetsu Inoue. It was released on July 11, 1994, by FAX +49-69/450464.

Track listing

Personnel 
Adapted from the Cymatic Scan liner notes.

Musicians
Tetsu Inoue – musical arrangements
Bill Laswell – musical arrangements

Technical
Ernst Haas – photography
Layng Martine – assistant engineer
Robert Musso – engineering, programming

Release history

References

External links 
 
 Cymatic Scan at Bandcamp

1994 albums
Collaborative albums
Tetsu Inoue albums
Bill Laswell albums
FAX +49-69/450464 albums
Subharmonic (record label) albums